Caerlanrig - also spelled 'Carlenrig' - (Gaelic: Cathair Lannraig) is a hamlet in the parish of Cavers, Borders, Scotland, lying on the River Teviot, 6 miles (10 km) north east of that river's source, and 10 miles (16 km) south west of Hawick.

Etymology
The first element of the name is probably the extinct Cumbric cair 'fortification', though Gaelic cathair has been suggested. The second element is generally taken as Cumbric lanerx, meaning 'clearing' (cf. Welsh llanerch). Another suggestion is that the name is Cumbric cair + Old English lang 'long' and hrycg 'ridge'.

Border reiver
It is best known for being the site where John Armstrong of Gilnockie, notorious member of Clan Armstrong and brother of Thomas, Laird of Mangerton was captured and hanged by King James V for being a reiver.

See also
List of places in the Scottish Borders
List of places in Scotland

References

External links 

RCAHMS record for Caerlanrig
RCAHMS record for Caerlanrig, Watch Knowe
Gazetteer for Scotland: Caerlanrig
 Photographs of 'A tour of the Armstrong Borderland', including Gilnockie's gravemarker

Other map sources: 

Villages in the Scottish Borders